Associazione Sportiva Dilettantistica Union Quinto is an Italian association football club located in Quinto di Treviso, Veneto.

It currently plays in Eccellenza Veneto.

History
The club was founded in 1937.

Colors and badge
Its colors are red and blue.

References

External links
Official homepage
Info Site

Football clubs in Italy
Association football clubs established in 1937
Football clubs in Veneto
1937 establishments in Italy